Marguerite R. Fay (died July 9, 1962) was an American politician from Maine. A Republican, Longstaff represented Portland, Maine in the Maine House of Representatives from 1949 to 1952 (94th-95th Legislatures). During the 94th Legislature, Fay was one of three women elected to the House of Representatives. Marion L. Longstaff and Lucia M. Cormier were the others.

References

Year of birth missing
1962 deaths
Women state legislators in Maine
Politicians from Portland, Maine
Republican Party members of the Maine House of Representatives
20th-century American politicians
20th-century American women politicians